Leeds Central is a constituency recreated in 1983 represented in the House of Commons of the UK Parliament since 1999 by Hilary Benn of the Labour Party. A former guise of the seat spanned 1885 to 1955.

Boundaries 

1885–1918: The Municipal Borough of Leeds wards of Mill Hill and West, and parts of the wards of Brunswick and Central.

1918–1950: The County Borough of Leeds wards of Central, Mill Hill, South, and West, and parts of the wards of Brunswick, Headingley, and North West.

1950–1955: The County Borough of Leeds wards of Armley and New Wortley, Blenheim, Central, Holbeck North, Mill Hill, and South and Westfield.

1983–1997: The City of Leeds wards of Beeston, City and Holbeck, Richmond Hill, and University.

1997–2010: As above plus Hunslet.

2010–present: The City of Leeds wards of Beeston and Holbeck, Burmantofts and Richmond Hill, City and Hunslet, Hyde Park and Woodhouse, and Middleton Park.

Following the Leeds City Council ward boundary changes prior to the 2018 election, the majority of the City and Hunslet ward became the new Hunslet and Riverside ward, whilst Leeds city centre was included in the new Little London and Woodhouse ward. Hyde Park became part of a new Headingley and Hyde Park ward, shared with the Leeds North West constituency.

Constituency profile 
The business and retail centre of Leeds is at the heart. A relatively affluent hub having a large minority of its housing forming by luxury, well-served apartments or streets of grand middle-class Victorian houses, the seat has sporadic deprivation, typified by certain densely packed rows of terraced houses, home to many Labour-inclined and often low-income voters.  Two large, well-ranked, universities in the city centre, the professional services sector and a 21st-century increase in technology businesses has brought prosperity to the younger generations of the city.  The older generations of the city have lived through the closure of many mass consumer product manufacturing and materials processing businesses in Leeds throughout the mid-20th century. Leeds' two universities produce a significant student electorate. Middleton in the south of the seat has a golf course, a miniature railway and an upcoming urban mountain bike trail centre within the boundaries.

History

First creation
The constituency was created in 1885 by the Redistribution of Seats Act 1885, and was first used in the general election of that year *the large Leeds seat had previously been represented by two MPs (1832–1868) and three MPs (1868–1885)). From 1885 it was represented by five single-member constituencies: Leeds Central, Leeds East, Leeds North, Leeds South and Leeds West.  The constituencies of Morley, Otley and Pudsey were also created in 1885. The constituency was abolished in 1955. After the 1955 general election: Leeds was represented by Leeds East (created 1885, abolished 1918, recreated 1955), Leeds North East (created 1918), Leeds North West (created 1950), Leeds South (created 1885), and Leeds South East (created 1918). There were also constituencies of Batley and Morley (created 1918) and Pudsey (created 1885, replaced by Pudsey and Otley 1918–1950).

Second creation, current creation
Revival
The constituency was re-created for the 1983 general election.

Results of the winning party
The seat has been won by the Labour Party's candidate since 1983.  Benn, elected in 1999 on the demise of Fatchett, has achieved an absolute majority (plurality of votes) in three of five elections for Leeds Central. The 2015 result made the seat the 40-safest of Labour's 232 seats by percentage of majority.

Opposition parties
Conservative runner-up, Wilson, in 2015 failed to reflect the positive national swing and fell to 17.3% of the votes cast. A candidature of UKIP, not present in 2010, saw a total share of the vote, hence positive swing, of 15.7% and thus third position..  Green Party running, not present in 2010, resulted in a 7.9% polling and fourth-place, its candidate retained his deposit.  The fifth-placed Liberal Democrat forfeited her deposit..

Turnout
In general elections turnout has ranged from 87.9% in 1910 to 41.7% in 2001.  In its 1999 by-election the constituency experienced the lowest voter turnout post-war of 19.6%.

Members of Parliament

MPs 1885–1955

MPs since 1983

Elections

Elections in the 2010s

Elections in the 2000s

Elections in the 1990s

Elections in the 1980s

Elections in the 1950s

Elections in the 1940s

Elections in the 1930s

Elections in the 1920s

Elections in the 1910s 

 *  Terry was supported by the three local branches of National Association of Discharged Sailors and Soldiers, National Federation of Discharged and Demobilized Sailors and Soldiers and Comrades of the Great War.

General Election 1914–15:

Another General Election was required to take place before the end of 1915. The political parties had been making preparations for an election to take place and by the July 1914, the following candidates had been selected; 
Liberal: Robert Armitage

Elections in the 1900s

Elections in the 1890s

Elections in the 1880s

See also 
 List of parliamentary constituencies in West Yorkshire
 1999 Leeds Central by-election

Notes

References

Parliamentary constituencies in Yorkshire and the Humber
Constituencies of the Parliament of the United Kingdom established in 1885
Constituencies of the Parliament of the United Kingdom disestablished in 1955
Constituencies of the Parliament of the United Kingdom established in 1983
Politics of Leeds